The Modoc Northern Railroad  is a defunct railroad company that operated over  of track in northeastern California and southern Oregon and was based in Tulelake, California. The railroad connected Klamath Falls to Alturas, California, and Lakeview, Oregon, to Alturas, California. The railroad shipped mostly timber products and some perlite from the mine and mill near Lakeview.

The rails used by the Modoc Northern were first laid out in June 1927 by a non-operating subsidiary of the Southern Pacific Company with the same name. On November 1, 2005, Union Pacific Railroad leased the Modoc line, connecting Klamath Falls to Alturas, to the MNRR for five years. By request of the Lake County, Oregon, commissioners, the MNRR also took over operation of the Lake County Railway, connecting Alturas to Lakeview, in 2006. UP cancelled the lease on May 5, 2009, and a new operator has assumed control of the Lake County Railroad.

References

Spin-offs of the Union Pacific Railroad
Defunct California railroads
Defunct Oregon railroads
Alturas, California
History of Modoc County, California
Railway companies established in 2005
Railway companies disestablished in 2009
2005 establishments in California
2009 disestablishments in California